Luciano Di Palma (25 May 1944 – March 2016) was an Italian judoka. He competed in the men's half-middleweight event at the 1972 Summer Olympics.

References

1944 births
2016 deaths
Italian male judoka
Olympic judoka of Italy
Judoka at the 1972 Summer Olympics
Sportspeople from Rome